The 13th Air Defense Division (Serbo-Croatian: 13. divizija protivvazdušne odbrane/ 13. дивизија противваздушне одбране) was an air defense division established in 1968.

History
The 13th Air Defense Division was formed on January 20, 1968. The divisions command was first at Skoplje. It has failed to develop into a unit volume of other air defense divisions. It has been disbanded by order from September 14, 1972.

Assignments
Command of Yugoslav Air Force 
1st Aviation Corps

Organization
83rd Fighter Aviation Regiment

Commanding officers
Ismet Kulenović

References

Divisions of Yugoslav Air Force
Military units and formations established in 1968
Military units and formations disestablished in 1972